Canterbury of New Zealand (commonly referred to simply as Canterbury) is a New Zealand sports equipment manufacturing company focused on rugby. The company originated from the Canterbury region in New Zealand.

Canterbury of New Zealand was established in 1904, producing garments in Canterbury, New Zealand. The company made military uniforms during the First World War, before producing kit for the All Blacks. The brand's tagline is "Committed To The Game". Its logo is the silhouettes of three Kiwi birds creating the letters CCC; the initials of the Canterbury Clothing Company and representing the three people who founded the company.

The head office is in Avondale, Auckland, New Zealand; the global headquarters are located in Stockport, UK; and satellite offices in Sydney and Brisbane, Australia.

Rugby products manufactured by Canterbury include jersey uniforms, protection (head protectors and mouthguards), boots, and balls. The company also produces casual wear clothing (shorts, t-shirts, polo shirts, pants, jackets, hoodies, socks), and accessories (bags, backpacks, hats, scarves)

History

Canterbury of New Zealand was established in 1904 by three English immigrants, John Lane, Pringle Walker and Alfred Rudkin. The company began producing garments in Canterbury, New Zealand. Canterbury then began making uniforms for the New Zealand and Australian armies during the First World War. Later, the brand was approached to make rugby attire for the All Blacks.

In 2006, Canterbury sold its South African operations to investment group House of Monatic, which set up Canterbury South Africa to run these operations under licence.

The European arm, Canterbury Europe Ltd, based in Stockport, was purchased by JD Sports in 2009, then sold on in 2012 to sports and fashion retail group Pentland Group for £22.7m.

Sponsorships

Cricket

National teams

Club teams
 Durham

Rugby union

National teams

  British and Irish Lions

Club teams

 Alumni
 Champagnat
 Ateneo Cultural y Deportivo Don Bosco Rugby
 Brothers Sunshine Coast
 Noosa Dolphins
 SPAC
 Cambridge R.U.F.C. 
 Union Bordeaux Bègles
 Castres
 Rugby Pro D2
 Dax
 Berlin Irish RFC
 Mogliano
 Petrarca Rugby
 Rugby Udine Union FVG
 Sunwolves
 Toshiba Brave Lupus
 Samsung Heavy Industries
 Seoul Survivors
 Taranaki
 Rotterdamse Studenten
 Leidsch Studenten Rugby Gezelschap
 Ceylonese RFC
 Kandy
 Falcons
 Griffons
 Golden Lions
 Washington Irish

Associations
  Royal Navy RU
  Royal Air Force RU 
  Auckland RU

Rugby league

National teams
 Australia

Representative

Former sponsorships

 New Zealand
 Blues
 Chiefs
 Crusaders
 Highlanders
 Hurricanes
 Scotland
 Glasgow Warriors
 South Africa
 Lions
 Sharks
 Cheetahs
 Southern Kings
 England
 Bath Rugby
 Russia
 Leinster Rugby
 Munster Rugby
 Ulster Rugby
 Cardiff Blues
 Ospreys
 Leicester Tigers
 Suntory Sungoliath

 Australia
 Canberra Raiders
 Canterbury-Bankstown Bulldogs
 Melbourne Storm
 Newcastle Knights
 New Zealand Warriors
 North Queensland Cowboys
 Parramatta Eels
 Melbourne Football Club
 North Melbourne Kangaroos
 Western Bulldogs
 Brumbies
 Reds
 Waratahs
 Lille OSC
  Portsmouth
 Deportivo de La Coruña
 AZ Alkmaar
 Football Kingz
  Sri Lanka Navy Sports Club
 Trinity College, Kandy
 Royal College Colombo Sri Lanka

See also
Rugby shirt

References

External links
 

Manufacturing companies established in 1904
Clothing companies of New Zealand
Sporting goods manufacturers of New Zealand
Sportswear brands
Clothing brands
Manufacturing companies based in Auckland
New Zealand brands